Bengt may refer to:

People

In arts, entertainment and media

Actors
 Bengt Djurberg (1898–1941), Swedish actor and singer
 Bengt Ekerot (1920–1971), Swedish actor and director
 Bengt Eklund (1925–1998), Swedish actor
 Bengt Logardt (1914–1994), Swedish actor, screenwriter and film director
 Bengt Nilsson (actor) (born 1954), Swedish actor

Journalists and writers
 Bengt Feldreich (1925-2019), Swedish journalist and teacher
 Bengt Frithiofsson (born 1939), Swedish wine writer
 Bengt Lidner (1757–1793), Swedish poet
 Bengt Linder (1929–1985), Swedish writer and journalist
 Bengt Magnusson (born 1950), Swedish journalist and a TV presenter
 Bengt Pohjanen (born 1944), Swedish author, translator and priest

In music
 Bengt Berger (born 1942), Swedish jazz drummer, composer and producer
 Bengt Calmeyer, Swedish musician in the band Turbonegro
 Bengt Djurberg (1898–1941), Swedish actor and singer
 Bengt Forsberg (born 1952), Swedish concert pianist
 Bengt Hallberg (1932–2013), Swedish jazz musician
 Bengt Hambraeus (1928–2000), Swedish organist, composer and musicologist
 Bengt Lagerberg (born 1973), drummer in the Swedish rock band The Cardigans

In other arts
 Bengt Erland Fogelberg (1786–1854), Swedish sculptor
 Bengt Forslund (born 1932), Swedish film producer, screenwriter and production manager
 Bengt Lindroos (1918–2010), Swedish architect
 Bengt Lindström (1925–2008), Swedish artist
 Bengt Logardt (1914–1994), Swedish actor, screenwriter and film director
 Bengt Nordenberg (1822–1902), Swedish artist
 Bengt Schalin (1889–1982), Finnish garden architect and botanist

In government and politics
 Bengt-Anders Johansson (born 1951), Swedish politician of the Moderate Party
 Bengt Berg (born 1946), Swedish poet and politician
 Bengt Bergt (born 1982), German drummer and politician
 Bengt Börjesson (1920–1977), Swedish politician
 Bengt Gabrielsson Oxenstierna (1623–1702), Swedish statesman
 Bengt Gottfried Forselius (c. 1660–1688), founder of public education in Estonia
 Bengt Göransson (1932–2021), Swedish politician
 Bengt Holgersson (born 1941), first Governor of Skåne County
 Bengt Lidforss (1868–1913), Swedish socialist
 Bengt Norling (1925–2002), Swedish politician 
 Bengt Rösiö (1927–2019), Swedish diplomat
 Bengt Westerberg (born 1943), Swedish politician

In science and academia

Life sciences
 Bengt Anders Euphrasén (1756–1796), Swedish botanist and zoologist
 Bengt Berg (ornithologist) (1885–1967), Swedish ornithologist, zoologist, wildlife photographer and writer
 Bengt Nölting (1962–2009), German physicist and biophysicist
 Bengt I. Samuelsson (born 1934), Swedish biochemist
 Bengt Schalin (1889–1982), Finnish garden architect and botanist

Physical sciences
 Bengt Andersson Qvist (1729–1799), Swedish chemist and mineralogist
 Bengt Edlén (1906–1993), Swedish professor of physics and astronomer
 Bengt Nölting (1962–2009), German physicist and biophysicist
 Bengt Nordén (born 1945), Swedish chemist
 Bengt Strömgren (1908–1987), Danish astronomer and astrophysicist; namesake of asteroid 1846 Bengt

Other disciplines
 Bengt-Åke Lundvall (born 1941), professor of Business Studies at Aalborg University in Denmark
 Bengt Danielsson (1921–1997), anthropologist and crew member on the Kon-Tiki
 Bengt Feldreich (born 1925), Swedish journalist and teacher
 Bengt Holbek (1933–1992), Danish folklorist
 Bengt R. Holmström (born 1949), Finnish professor of economics at M.I.T.
 Bengt af Klintberg (born 1938), Swedish ethnologist

In sport

Aquatic sports
 Bengt Backlund (1926–2006), Swedish flatwater canoer
 Bengt Baron (born 1962), Swedish former backstroke swimmer
 Bengt Gingsjö (born 1952), Swedish freestyle and medley swimmer
 Bengt Heyman (1883–1942), Swedish sailor
 Bengt Linfors, Swedish sprint canoer
 Bengt Palmquist (1923–1995), Swedish sailor
 Bengt Zikarsky (born 1967), German former freestyle swimmer

Football (soccer)
 Bengt Berg (footballer), Swedish former footballer
 Bengt Berndtsson (1933–2015), Swedish football player
 Bengt Gustavsson (1928–2017), Swedish football player and trainer
 Bengt Lindskog (1933–2008), Swedish football player
 Bengt Madsen (born 1942), Swedish football chairman
 Bengt Sæternes (born 1975), Norwegian football player

Winter sports
 Bengt-Åke Gustafsson (born 1958), Swedish ice hockey player
 Bengt Åkerblom (1967–1995), Swedish ice hockey player
 Bengt Eriksson (1931–2014), Swedish Nordic combined skier
 Bengt Fjällberg (born 1961), Swedish alpine skier
 Bengt Leandersson, Swedish ski-orienteering competitor
 Bengt Lundholm (born 1955), Swedish retired professional ice hockey player
 Bengt Malmsten (1922–1996), Swedish speed skater
 Bengt Walden (born 1973), Swedish-born, American luger
 Börje-Bengt Hedblom, Swedish bobsledder

Other sports
 Bengt Åberg (born 1944), Swedish motocross racer
 Bengt Bengtsson (1897–1977), Swedish gymnast
 Bengt Fahlqvist (1922–2004), Swedish wrestler
 Bengt Fröman (born 1950), Swedish male badminton player
 Bengt Jansson (born 1943), Swedish international speedway rider
 Bengt Johansson (handball) (born 1942), Swedish handball player and coach
 Bengt Lagercrantz (1887–1924), Swedish sport shooter
 Bengt Levin (1958–2020), Swedish orienteering competitor
 Bengt Ljungquist (1912–1979), Swedish fencer and equestrian
 Bengt Morberg (1897–1968), Swedish gymnast
 Bengt Sjöstedt (1906–1981), Finnish hurdler

In other fields
 Bengt Ekenberg (1912–1986), Swedish chess master
 Bengt Fredman (1916–2008), Swedish Army officer
 Bengt Hägglund (1920–2015), Swedish theologian
 Bengt Lehander (1925–1994), Swedish Air Force lieutenant general
 Bengt Lundvall (1915–2010), Swedish Navy admiral
 Bengt Lönnbom (born 1933), Swedish Air Force major general
 Bengt Nordenskiöld (1891–1983), Swedish Air Force general
 Bengt Rosenius (1918–1979), Swedish Air Force major general
 Bengt Snivil (mid-12th century), Swedish magnate

Shared names
 Bengt Andersson (disambiguation)
 Bengt Gustafsson (disambiguation)
 Bengt Jönsson (disambiguation)
 Bengt Oxenstierna (disambiguation)
 Bengt Simonsen (disambiguation)

Other uses
 1846 Bengt, a main-belt asteroid discovered in 1960; named for Bengt Strömgren

See also
 Bengtsson, a Swedish family name originating in Bengt
 Scandinavian family name etymology

Swedish masculine given names